This is a complete listing of episodes from the Nickelodeon animated television series KaBlam!

The titles for all episodes of these series are named after the ads on the back cover of the "comic book", which closes at the end of each episode.

Series overview

Episodes

Season 1 (1996–97)

Season 2 (1997–98)

Season 3 (1998–99)

Season 4 (1999–2000)

References 

KaBlam!
KaBlam!
KaBlam!